The Rasulpur River (also spelt Rasalpur) is a tributary of the Hooghly River. The Rasulpur flows through Paschim Medinipur and Purba Medinipur districts. It flows as Bagda River until Kalinagar and then flows as Rasulpur River. Its tributaries are Itaberia Khal, Mugberia Khal, Palabani Khal, Padurbheri Khal and Alipur Khal. It joins the Bay of Bengal shortly after Petua Ghat, a Fishing Harbor just before the estuary  of the river,  opposite Sagar Island.

References

Rivers of West Bengal
Rivers of India